Haskell is an unincorporated community in LaPorte County, Indiana, in the United States.

History
Haskell, originally called Haskell Station, had its start in the 1850s as a railroad town. The community was likely named for James Haskell, a pioneer settler. A post office was established at Haskell in 1857, and remained in operation until it was discontinued in 1937.

References

Unincorporated communities in LaPorte County, Indiana
1857 establishments in Indiana
Unincorporated communities in Indiana